Öster, also called East, is a city district in Malmö Municipality, Sweden. It was established on 1 July 2013 after the merger of Husie and Rosengård. It has a population of 44,300.

References

City districts of Malmö